Pocillopora fungiformis is a species of colonial stony coral in the family Pocilloporidae. It is native to Madagascar.

Description
Irregular verrucae (lumpy skeletal outgrowths) grow on the surface of the coral, and on branches growing at oblique angles, the verrucae are more abundant on the upper side. The individual corallites (stony cups in which the polyps sit) are small and crowded, each having one septum (stony ridge) more developed than the rest. This coral is some shade of greenish-brown.

Distribution and habitat
P. fungiformis is endemic to Madagascar where it is found on the north end of the island and the south end.

Status
P. fungiformis has a small range and is an uncommon species. It is particularly susceptible to bleaching and coral diseases and the reefs where it lives are under threat. The International Union for Conservation of Nature has assessed its conservation status as being "endangered".

References

Pocilloporidae
Animals described in 2000